Bruner Hill is a hill,  high, which is snow-covered except for some exposed rock on the north face. It was mapped by the United States Geological Survey from surveys and from U.S. Navy aerial photographs, 1959–65, and named by the Advisory Committee on Antarctic Names for Lieutenant Michael G. Bruner, U.S. Navy, LC-130 aircraft commander during Operation Deep Freeze 1970 and 1971.

References 

Hills of Marie Byrd Land